The Standard Point Location Code® (SPLC™) is a 9 digit geographic code used by North American transportation industries, especially rail. SPLC is owned and maintained by the National Motor Freight Traffic Association. SPLC exist for terminals within the United States, Canada, and Mexico. For the US and Canada, the first two digits refer to a state, province or territory. The second two digits refer to a county or its equivalent. The third two digits refer to a city or municipal region. The remaining three digits refer to a specific location within the city. For Mexican SPLC, the first three digits refer to the state and the second three digits refer to a municipal region within the state. Like the US and Canadian SPLC, the last three digits refer to a specific location within the city. If the last three digits are "000" then the SPLC is not defined beyond city.

External links
Official Website

References

Transport in North America